Electric Multiple Units (EMU) are powered on the metro network of Athens, with five or six coaches. EMU-5s are of a former type and are limited to Line 1. On Lines 2 and 3, routes are only operated with EMU-6s. The trainsets were put into operation at STASY (Statheres Sygkoinonies) in 2011, with its establishment (previously operated for the companies ISAP S.A. and AMEL S.A.).

Line 1 Historical stock

Steam locomotives

Sap
In the early period (1869–1904) the railway used 22 steam tank locomotives of about 6 different types. The majority were of 2-4-0T configuration, made in the United Kingdom by Hudswell Clarke and Sharp Stewart. After electrification, some the steam locomotives were sold to the Hellenic State Railways (SEK).

Lavrion Square–Strofyli railway
Initially Attica Railways used nine Tubize 0-6-2T steam locomotives (1885). Later it acquired nine Krauss Z 2-6-0T, plus one of the same type constructed in Piraeus by Vassiliadis Works. After 1929 only the Tubize locomotives remained in use on the Kifissia line, as the Krauss locomotives were transferred to SPAP for the Lavrion branch.

First generation EMUs
Since electrification (1904) the railway used almost exclusively electric multiple unit (EMU) trains. The vehicles are classified in batches (or deliveries). The first four batches consisted of wooden passenger cars on iron or steel frames. Currently only a short train of two wooden railcars is preserved, modified with the addition of Scharfenberg couplers at each end and is displayed during special events.

The first generation rolling stock was numbered as in the following table:

Second generation EMUs
The fifth (1951), sixth (1958) and seventh (1968) batches were of steel construction, made by Siemens-MAN. At the same time Scharfenberg couplers were introduced.

Third generation EMUs
Trains of batch 9 were made by LEW in the German Democratic Republic and have been withdrawn. Trains of batches 8,10,11 which also part of third generation EMUs are still in use.

Other rolling stock

In 1904 two electric locomotives, numbered 20 and 21, were bought from Thomson-Houston.

In 1911 the railway bought from Goossens two steeple-cab electric locomotives (numbered 31 and 32) and a self-propelled electric freight railcar (41), capable of operating from third rail or overhead line. These could operate over the Piraeus Harbour tramway, the Piraeus-Perama light railway as well as on the mainline to Thision and Omonoia. Freight railcar 41 was used initially to carry bags of transcontinental mail unloaded from passenger liners in Piraeus. Locomotive 32 is still in use, with the overhead collector removed.

In addition the railway owns a road-rail Unimog car and a ballast tamper.

During 1981–1984 ISAP leased six four-car, bright yellow trains of narrow loading gauge (type G-I or Gisela) from East Berlin's metro.

In the early 1980s consideration was given to the purchase of 60 secondhand cars of London Underground R Stock, built between 1938 and 1959, but ultimately no deal was made and new carriages were purchased instead.

Piraeus rolling stock works

Athens & Piraeus Railway, in common with most railways of the steam era, had its own rolling stock heavy maintenance works, located next to Piraeus station. In 1926 this became property of E.I.S. In addition to maintenance, repair and rebuilding, Piraeus works constructed a significant number of railway cars, mostly between 1880 and 1960. The most significant projects were the construction of 12 electric rail cars in 1923 and the rebuilding of rolling stock destroyed by allied bombing in 1944. Another noteworthy project was the construction of a small number of electric trams, based on a Dick Kerr model (1939).

An excellent example of the technical skill available at Piraeus works is the Royal Saloon (1888), a present to King George I of Greece. This luxurious vehicle was much admired and it was exhibited at the 1888 "Olympia Fair" (First Athens International Exhibition) held in Zappeion. The Royal Saloon survives to date, and is exhibited in the Railway Museum of Athens.

Line 1

Lines 2 and 3

Line 4 
Line 4, at some point under the original design, will have automatic trains without a driver. In November 2020, Alstom was chosen to supply the line with 20 4-car automated Metropolis trains, operated under Urbalis 400 signalling system.

See also 
Athens–Piraeus Electric Railways

Sources 
https://web.archive.org/web/20091123073235/http://www.isap.gr/eng/page.asp?id=43

https://web.archive.org/web/20180501223652/http://www.theodore.gr/theodore.gr/Transport_Trains_Hlektrikou.html

References 

Athens Metro
750 V DC multiple units
25 kV AC multiple units
Electric multiple units of Greece